Sofie De Vuyst (born 2 April 1987) is a Belgian former racing cyclist, who rode professionally between 2006 and 2019. Between 2010 and 2016 she competed in every UCI Road World Championships. She was voted 2019 Flandrienne of the Year (best Belgian female cyclist).

In September 2019, De Vuyst tested positive for an exogenous steroid in an out of competition control. De Vuyst's positive test came on 18 September, in the week after the Belgium Tour, where she finished seventh overall and won the mountains classification, and before the UCI Road World Championships.

Major results

2009
 3rd Dwars door de Westhoek
2011
 2nd Road race, National Road Championships
 4th Erondegemse Pijl
 5th Omloop van het Hageland
 6th Halle-Buizingen
 6th Dwars door de Westhoek
 8th Overall Tour Féminin en Limousin
2012
 2nd Time trial, National Road Championships
 2nd Overall Tour de Bretagne Féminin
 8th Overall Belgium Tour
 8th Erondegemse Pijl
2013
 2nd Erondegemse Pijl
 3rd Road race, National Road Championships
 7th Overall Belgium Tour
1st  Mountains classification
1st  Belgian rider classification
 8th Overall Tour de Bretagne Féminin
 8th Cholet Pays de Loire Dames
 9th Le Samyn des Dames
 9th Knokke-Heist – Bredene
2014
 3rd Road race, National Road Championships
 3rd Le Samyn des Dames
 4th Gent–Wevelgem
 5th Omloop van het Hageland
 6th Omloop Het Nieuwsblad
 7th Diamond Tour
 8th Erondegemse Pijl
 9th Overall Internationale Thüringen Rundfahrt der Frauen
 9th Overall Belgium Tour
 9th Trofee Maarten Wynants
 9th Holland Hills Classic
2015
 National Road Championships
3rd Road race
3rd Time trial
 4th Trofee Maarten Wynants
 7th Overall Auensteiner–Radsporttage
 8th Overall Belgium Tour
 9th Gooik–Geraardsbergen–Gooik
 10th Dwars door Vlaanderen
2016
 5th Overall Trophée d'Or Féminin
 9th Pajot Hills Classic
2018
 3rd Overall Tour de Feminin-O cenu Českého Švýcarska
1st Stage 5
 3rd Kreiz Breizh Elites Dames
 4th Gooik–Geraardsbergen–Gooik
 8th Overall Tour Cycliste Féminin International de l'Ardèche
 10th Brabantse Pijl Dames Gooik
 10th La Classique Morbihan
 10th Grand Prix de Plumelec-Morbihan Dames
2019
 1st Brabantse Pijl Dames Gooik
 1st  Mountains classification Grand Prix Elsy Jacobs
 2nd La Classique Morbihan
 3rd Erondegemse Pijl
 6th Dwars door Vlaanderen for Women
 6th Grand Prix de Plumelec-Morbihan Dames
 7th Overall Belgium Tour
1st  Mountains classification
 7th GP de Plouay – Bretagne
 8th Omloop Het Nieuwsblad
 8th Omloop van het Hageland

See also
 2006 Lotto–Belisol Ladiesteam season
 2009 Lotto–Belisol Ladiesteam season

References

External links

1987 births
Living people
Belgian female cyclists
People from Zottegem
Cyclists at the 2015 European Games
European Games competitors for Belgium
Cyclists from East Flanders